This article lists the major power stations located in Heilongjiang province.

Non-renewable

Coal-based

Renewable

Hydroelectric

Conventional

Pumped-storage

References 

Power stations
Heilongjiang